Mathias Bourgue (born 18 January 1994) is a French tennis player playing on the ATP Challenger Tour. He has a career-high ATP singles ranking of No. 140 achieved on 24 April 2017.

Career
He received a wildcard to advance to the singles main draw in the 2016 French Open, where he reached the second round defeating Jordi Samper-Montaña, before losing to world No. 2 Andy Murray in five sets.

Challenger and Futures finals

Singles: 24 (12-12)

References

External links
 
 

1994 births
Living people
French male tennis players
Sportspeople from Avignon